This is a chronological list of notable people from Groningen, who were either born and raised there, were long-term residents, or otherwise have a strong association with the area.

Before 1750 
 Wessel Gansfort (1419–1489), theologian and early humanist
 Volcher Coiter (1534–1576), anatomist, founder of comparative osteology and first to identify cerebrospinal meningitis
 Christiaan Coevershoff (1595–1659), Dutch Golden Age painter
 Egbert Bartholomeusz Kortenaer (1604–1665), admiral
 Adriaan Geerts Wildervanck (1605–1661), businessman and coloniser
 Albert Eckhout (c.1610–1665), portrait and still life painter
 Roche Braziliano (c.1630–c.1671), pirate
 Joris Andringa (1635–1676), naval officer
 Tiberius Hemsterhuis (1685–1766), philologist and critic
 Albert Schultens (1686–1750), philologist
 Daniel Bernoulli (1700–1782), mathematician and physicist
 Johannes Antiquus (1702–1750), painter
 Albertus Antonius Hinsz (1704–1785), organ-builder
 Bernard II van Risamburgh (c.1710—c.1767), cabinetmaker
 Willem Arnold Alting (1724–1800), Governor-General of the Dutch East Indies from 1780 until 1797
 Elisabeth Wassenbergh (1729–1781), painter
 Etta Palm d'Aelders  (1743–1799), early feminist and spy
 Leopold von Goeckingk (1748–1828), German lyric poet, journalist and Prussian official.
 Johann August Just (c.1750–c.1791), pianist, violinist, and composer
 Abel Janszoon Tasman (1603–1659), explorer, seafarer, merchant for the Dutch East India Company

1750–1870 
 John Goodricke (1764–1786), astronomer, observed the variable star Algol
 Albert Dominicus Trip van Zoudtlandt (1776—1835), lieutenant-general at the Battle of Waterloo
 Petrus Hofman Peerlkamp (1786–1865), classical scholar and critic.
 Geert Adriaans Boomgaard (1788–1899), first validated supercentenarian and last living veteran of Napoleon's Grande Armée
 Coos Cremers (1806-1882), politician, member of the Senate from 1850 to 1877
 Schelto van Heemstra, Baron Heemstra (1807–1864), politician, Prime minister from 1861 to 1862.
 Jozef Israëls (1824–1911), painter of the Hague School
 Joseph Ascher (1829–1869), composer and pianist
 Hendrik Willem Mesdag (1831–1915), marine art painter
 Samuel van Houten (1837–1930), politician, cabinet minister, founder of the Liberal Party
 Alexander de Savornin Lohman (1837–1924), politician, leader of the Christian Historical Union
 Otto Eerelman (1839–1926), painter, known for his depictions of dogs and horses
 Klaas Plantinga (1846–1922), distiller, founded the Plantinga Distillery
 Heike Kamerlingh Onnes (1853–1926), Nobel laureate physicist who pioneered refrigeration and superconductivity
 Gerard Bolland (1854–1922), autodidact, linguist, philosopher, biblical scholar and lecturer
 René de Marees van Swinderen (1860–1955), diplomat and politician
 Barbara Elisabeth van Houten (1863–1950), painter
 Gerrit van Houten (1866–1934), painter and artist
 Dirk Jan de Geer (1870–1960), Dutch Prime Minister (1926–29, 1939–40)

1870–1900 
 Jantina Tammes (1871–1947), botanist and geneticist, first professor of genetics in the Netherlands.
 Johan Huizinga (1872–1945), historian
 Jaap Eden (1873–1925), only male athlete to have won world championships in both speed skating and cycling
 Bert Nienhuis (1873–1960), ceramist, designer, and jewelry designer
 Gerrit David Gratama (1874–1965), artist, writer, and director of the Frans Hals Museum
 Jan Gratama (1877–1947), architect
 Albert Hahn (1877–1918), political cartoonist, poster artist, and book cover designer 
 C. U. Ariëns Kappers (1877–1946), neurologist and anatomist
 Herman de Vries de Heekelingen (1880–1942), scholar and author, professor of palaeography at the University of Nijmegen
 Julia Culp (1880–1970), mezzo-soprano
 Dirk Janssen (1881–1986), gymnast in the 1908 Summer Olympics who was 105 at the time of his death, making him the longest-lived Olympic competitor
 Jonny Heykens (1884–1945), composer of light classical music
 Wilhelm Baehrens (1885–1929), classical scholar
 Jan Janssen (1885–1953), gymnast who competed in the 1908 Summer Olympics
 Tonnis van der Heeg (1886-1958), trade unionist and political activist
 Pieter Korteweg (1888–1970), philatelist
 Alida Jantina Pott (1888–1931), artist
 Alidius Tjarda van Starkenborgh Stachouwer (1888–1978), last colonial Governor-General of the Netherlands East Indies
 Jaap Kunst (1891–1960), ethnomusicologist
 Michel Velleman (1895–1943), Jewish magician
 Hendrik de Vries (1896–1989), poet and painter, early surrealist 
 Paul Schuitema (1897–1973), graphic artist

1900–1930 
 Ulbo de Sitter (1902–1980), geologist at Leiden University, founder of school of structural geology 
 Jan Wolthuis (1903–1983), lawyer and collaborator, active in far-right politics after WWII
 Hans Dirk de Vries Reilingh (1908–2001), geographer and professor
 Elie Aron Cohen (1909–1993), doctor, Auschwitz survivor
 Theodoor Overbeek (1911–2007), professor of physical chemistry at Utrecht University
 Pieter Meindert Schreuder (1912–1945), resistance leader
 Lucas Hoving (1912–2000), modern dancer, choreographer and teacher 
 Jacob B. Bakema (1914–1981), modernist architect
 Anno Smith (1915–1990), artist, ceramist, painter, sculptor, and art teacher
 Jan C. Uiterwijk (1915–2005), entrepreneur and shipping line owner
 Andries Jan Pieters (1916–1952), collaborator, executed for war crimes
 Evert Musch (1918–2007), painter and professor at Academie Minerva
 Dirk Boonstra (1920–1944), active in the WWII resistance movement, caught and executed
 Poppe Damave (1921–1988), painter
 Selma Engel-Wijnberg (1922–2018), Jewish Holocaust survivor
 Henk Visser (1923–2006), arms and armory collector
 Jan Drenth (born 1925), chemist, was professor of structural chemistry at the University of Groningen
 Cor Edskes (1925–2015), authority on the history of organ music and building
 Wim Crouwel (born 1928), graphic designer, type designer and typographer. 
 Maarten Schmidt (1929–2022), astronomer named and optically identified a quasar
 Jan Borgman (born 1929), astronomer and university administrator 
 Dirk Bolt (born 1930), architect and town planner in Australia

1930–1950 
 Ida Vos (1931–2006), writer and poet
 Arie van Deursen (1931–2011), early modern period historian
 Nico Habermann (1932–1993), computer scientist
 Gerrit Krol (1934−2013), author, essayist and writer
 Ad van Luyn (born 1935), Roman Catholic bishop
 Bert de Vries (born 1938), politician 
 Wim T. Schippers (born 1942), artist, comedian, television director and voice actor 
 Driek van Wissen (1943–2010), poet
 Chas Gerretsen (born 1943), war photographer, photo journalist
 Martha Vonk-van Kalker (1943–2022), Senator
 Joanna Gash (born 1944), Australian politician
 Corrie Winkel (born 1944), backstroke swimmer and silver medalist 1964 Summer Olympics
 Jan Sloot (1945–1999), inventor, claimed to have invented a revolutionary data compression technique
 Andy Anstett (born 1946), Dutch-born Canadian politician
 Wubbo Ockels (1946–2014), physicist and astronaut of the European Space Agency
 Alphons Orie (born 1947), lawyer specialising in criminal law
 Alfred Lagarde (1948–1998), voice actor
 Diederik Grit (1949–2012), translator and translation scholar
 Sierd Cloetingh (born 1950), professor of earth sciences at Utrecht University

1950–present 
 Pete Hoekstra (born 1953), United States ambassador to the Netherlands
 Ellen van Wolde (born 1954), biblical scholar 
 Hanneke Kappen (born 1954), singer, radio and TV presenter
 Rob Nanninga (1955–2014), skeptic, writer, board member of Stichting Skepsis
 Bert Meijer (born 1955), organic chemist
 Gerard de Korte (born 1955), Roman Catholic bishop
 Joep Franssens (born 1955), composer
 Jan van der Kooi (born 1957), painter of figurative art
 Anita Buma (born 1958), pioneer Antarctic researcher
 Tjibbe Veldkamp (born 1962), author of children's books
 Wilma Mansveld (born 1962), politician
 Aernout Mik (born 1962), artist
 Peter Hofstee (born 1962), physicist and computer scientist
 Hans van den Hende (born 1964), Roman Catholic bishop
 Gerard Kemkers (born 1967), speed skating bronze medalist at 1988 Winter Olympics
 Didy Veldman (born 1967), choreographer 
 J. Maarten Troost (born 1969), travel writer
 Stephan Veen (born 1970), field hockey player in the 1996 and 2000 Summer Olympics
 Sharon Dijksma (born 1971), politician
 Diederik Samsom (born 1971), politician
 Michiel van Veen (born 1971), politician
 Attje Kuiken (born 1977), politician and former civil servant
 Rudmer Heerema (born 1978), politician
 Rutger Smith (born 1981), track and field athlete
 Henk Nijboer (born 1983), politician
 Sophie Polkamp (born 1984), field hockey athlete, two-time Olympic champion
 Kim Feenstra (born 1985), model
 Marijn Nijman (born 1985), former international cricketer
 Manja Smits (born 1985), politician
 Bauke Mollema (born 1986), cyclist
 Lorena Klijn (born 1987), kickboxer
 Tom-Jelte Slagter (born 1989), professional road racing cyclist
 Lois Abbingh (1992), handball player
 Jur P. van den Berg (born 1981), computer engineer
 Jorden van Foreest (born 1999), chess grandmaster

See also 

 List of Dutch people

References

Lists of people by city in the Netherlands